Willem de Rooij (born 1969 in Beverwijk, Netherlands) is an artist and educator working in a variety of media, including film and installation. He investigates the production, contextualization and interpretation of images. Appropriations and collaborations are fundamental to De Rooij's artistic method and his projects have stimulated new research in art history and ethnography.

Biography
Willem de Rooij studied art history at the University of Amsterdam (1989–1990), and art at the Gerrit Rietveld Academie (1990–95) and at the Rijksakademie (1997–98), both in Amsterdam. He worked in collaboration with Jeroen de Rijke (born 1970 in Brouwershaven, Netherlands, died in 2006) from 1994 to 2006, as De Rijke / De Rooij. Major monographic exhibitions were mounted at K21 in Düsseldorf in 2007, and at the Museo d’Arte Moderna di Bologna (MAMbo) in 2008, and they represented the Netherlands at the Venice Biennale in 2005. De Rooij has taught and lectured extensively since 1998. He worked at De Ateliers in Amsterdam from 2002–2014, is Professor of Fine Arts at the Städelschule in Frankfurt am Main, since 2006, and advisor at the Rijksakademie, Amsterdam, since 2015. In 2016, he co-founded BPA// Berlin program for artists, and became a member of the Royal Netherlands Academy of Arts and Sciences, KNAW.

In 2000, De Rooij won the Bâloise Art Prize, and he was nominated for the Hugo Boss Award in 2004 and the Vincent Award in 2014. He was a Robert Fulton Fellow at Harvard University in 2004, a DAAD fellow in Berlin in 2006 and a resident at the Goethe Institut in Salvador da Bahia in 2018.

Works 
In 2004, De Rooij began to include works of other artists in his own artworks. For example, his film Mandarin Ducks (2005) was shown at the Stedelijk Museum in Amsterdam in 2005 within the context of objects and artworks from the museum's collection. In 2007, De Rooij made two installations in which he included the work of artists Isa Genzken, Keren Cytter and designer Fong Leng: one at Galerie Chantal Crousel in Paris named "The Floating Feather", and one at Galerie Daniel Buchholz in Cologne named "Birds in a Park". His 2009 installation "Birds" was shown at Cubitt Artists in London and included, among others, works by Dutch artist Vincent Vulsma.

In 2010, De Rooij showed an installation titled Intolerance at the Neue Nationalgalerie in Berlin, combining 18 works by Dutch animalier painter Melchior d'Hondecoeter with a selection of 18th-century Hawaiian featherwork. The three-fold publication includes the first substantial monograph on the work of d’Hondecoeter to date, and a catalogue raisonné of all capes, helmets and god-images that are part of the category known as Hawaiian featherwork written by Adrienne Kaeppler.

A 2012 installation named Residual situates a 17th century painting by Jacob van Ruisdael in the location that it depicts: Bentheim Castle in the city of the same name.

De Rooij’s 2014 project Character is Fate consisted of a year long installation at FKAWDW in Rotterdam and a publication of a 1911 horoscope that Piet Mondrian had made for himself, before he emigrated from his native country the Netherlands.

Proposal for the Memorialization of 'Asoziale' and 'Berufsverbrecher''' (2018) aims to give the two groups that are underrepresented in German memorial culture a place in the memorial site at the former NS concentration camp in Dachau.

Since 2002, De Rooij has been making a series of sculptures made of flowers, the Bouquets.

Since 2010, De Rooij has been working on the first monographic publication on the life and work of the 18th century painter Dirk Valkenburg.

 Reception 
Describing the work of De Rijke / De Rooij in an introduction to a portfolio of their work published in Artforum in 2008, art historian Pamela M. Lee states that the artists trace "the recursive economy of the image: its affective power, its capacity to seduce and organize perception, and its mediation of time and subjectivity."

Speaking to Dieter Roelstraete in an interview published in the journal Afterall in 2010, De Rooij stated: "The very notion of 'representing', of 'imaging', is what my work is most deeply concerned with."

Pondering the nature of De Rooij's oeuvre in a 2016 Artforum article, art historian Daniel Birnbaum wrote that his works "operate as (...) instances of abstraction that cut right through the textures of meaning that we tend to read into works of art" and that they "might exist as physical crystallizations, but their logic owes much to the tactics of film: framing, cutting, editing, and, above all, focus. The very concept of focus presupposes a dialectic between discreteness and contextual embeddedness: To focus is to draw attention to this by ignoring that''. In the act of bringing an image into focus, the filmmaker prompts scrutiny of an object while also articulating the fact that the rest of the world is still out there, beyond the edge of the frame. This dialectic is key to De Rooij’s work, where the same meticulous care is given to display elements and framing devices as to the art itself."

Exhibitions 
Institutional solo exhibitions include Staatliche Kunstsammlungen, Dresden (2019); Kunstwerke Berlin (2017); IMA Brisbane (2017); MMK Museum of Modern Art, Frankfurt/Main (2016); Le Consortium, Dijon (2015); The Jewish Museum, New York (2014); Piktogram, Warsaw (2012); Neue Nationalgalerie, Berlin (2010); MAMBo Bologna (2008); K21, Düsseldorf (2007); Secession, Vienna (2005) and Kunsthalle Zürich (2003).

Group exhibitions include the John Hansard Gallery, Nottingham (2020); BDL Museum, Mumbai (2019); the Hammer Museum, Los Angeles (2018); Jakarta Biennale (2017); Limerick Biennial (2016); Aishti Foundation, Beirut (2015); 10th Shanghai Biennale (2014); Raw Material Company, Dakar (2013); BOZAR Centre for Fine Arts, Brussels (2011); Media City Seoul (2010); 2nd Athens Biennale (2009) and the Japanese American National Museum, Los Angeles (2008).

Collections 
De Rooij’s works can be found in the collections of Stedelijk Museum, Amsterdam; MUMOK, Vienna; Hamburger Bahnhof, Berlin; Centre Pompidou, Paris; MOCA, Los Angeles and MOMA, New York.

References

External links 
 Galerie Daniel Buchholz: Willem de Rooij
 Friedrich Petzel Gallery: Willem de Rooij
 Galerie Chantal Crousel: Willem de Rooij
 Regen Projects: Willem de Rooij
 Frieze Magazine: Willem de Rooij in conversation with Christopher Williams

1969 births
Living people
Dutch contemporary artists
People from Beverwijk
Gerrit Rietveld Academie alumni
Bâloise Prize winners
Art duos